"Tik Tok" (stylized as "TiK ToK" and pronounced as "tick tock") is the debut single by American singer Kesha, who co-wrote the song with its producers Dr. Luke and Benny Blanco. It was released on August 7, 2009, as the lead single from her debut studio album, Animal (2010). The opening line of the song came from an experience where Kesha woke up surrounded by beautiful women, to which she imagined P. Diddy being in a similar scenario. The experience prompted the writing of the song which she later brought to her producer, Dr. Luke, who was then contacted by P. Diddy in hopes of a collaboration; he came to the studio the same day and recorded his lines, and the song was completed.

The official remix features American rapper Pitbull.

According to Kesha, the song's lyrics are representative of her and based on her life. In the lyrics, which have a carefree message, the narrator talks about not letting anything bring them down. "Tik Tok" is an electropop and dance-pop song incorporating Auto-Tune and a minimalist bitpop beat interspersed with handclaps and synthesizers. The verses use a rap/sing vocal style while the chorus is sung. Some critics complimented the production as catchy, but others took issue with it as generic and disposable compared to the mainstream pop-music scene.

In the United States, "Tik Tok" spent nine weeks atop the Billboard Hot 100 and was certified eightfold platinum by the Recording Industry Association of America (RIAA). Topping the charts in many other countries including Australia—where it was certified ninefold platinum, Canada, France, Germany, Norway, and Switzerland, it was the best-selling single worldwide in 2010, selling 12.8 million copies. As of 2019, the song has sold over 18 million digital copies worldwide. "Tik Tok" was listed 61st on the all-time Billboard Hot 100 chart published in 2018.

Background and development
In 2005, Dr. Luke had just finished producing tracks for Kelly Clarkson's album Breakaway (2004) and was looking to expand further on his writing and producing credits. Luke solicited around to different people in the music business asking for demos from unknown artists. Two of the demos he received were from Katy Perry and Kesha. He was particularly taken with Kesha's demos which consisted of a self-penned country ballad and trip-hop track. The latter of the demos caught Luke off guard when she ran out of lyrics and started to rap, "I'm a white girl/From the 'Ville/Nashville, bitch. Uhh. Uhhhhh." The improvisation made her stand out from other artists that Luke had listened to, which he recalled: "That's when I was like, 'OK, I like this girl's personality. When you're listening to 100 CDs, that kind of bravado and chutzpah stand out." Following this, at the age of eighteen, Kesha signed to Luke's label, Kemosabe Records, and his publishing company, Prescription Songs.

After being signed to Luke's label she also signed to David Sonenberg's DAS management company. While at the label she worked with record producer Greg Wells, which she attributes to developing her sound on her first record, Animal (2010). Although she was signed to Luke and his label, Kesha never took priority as he was busy with other projects at the time. It was not until 2008 when Luke was working with Flo Rida on "Right Round" that he pulled Kesha in to contribute, giving her the female hook. Within a few months, the song became a worldwide hit. The event lead to different labels sparking interest in signing her, including RCA Records, to which she eventually signed.

Writing and recording

"Tik Tok" was written by Kesha, alongside Dr. Luke and Benny Blanco and was co-produced by Luke and Blanco. Kesha said the inspiration behind the song came from coming home half-drunk and stumbling after a night out of partying. She would then write down a few words to a song, and then the following morning she would wake up with the story waiting to be told. The opening line came from an experience where she woke up surrounded by "beautiful women", leading to her imagining P. Diddy being in a similar scenario. She then proceeded to bring the song to her producer Dr. Luke and Benny Blanco and the song was written. Four hours later, Diddy called Luke and said that they should do a song together. Diddy came to the studio later that day to contribute his lines and the collaboration was completed.

Engineering of the song was done by Emily Wright and Sam Holland at Conway Recording Studios in Los Angeles, California. While Kesha was in the studio with Dr. Luke and Blanco, she took three takes to get the song correct as she jokingly "white-girl rapped" over the beat. At one point in the song's production, she had wanted to re-write the verses of the song because she did not think that they were "funny or clever", feeling that they "kind of sucked." She elaborated, "I thought it was just another song, I thought it was just like all the other ones I'd written. I didn't even know if it was very good. I wanted to rewrite the verses, I didn't think it was funny or clever. I thought it kind of sucked. But everyone else liked it." Kesha ultimately did not end up rewriting any of the song's lyrics. She further described the theme of the song in an interview, emphasizing that it embodied her own lifestyle,
We're [Kesha and her friends] all young and broke and it doesn't matter. We can find clothes on the side of the street and go out and look fantastic, and kill it. If we don't have a car that doesn't stop us, because we'll take the bus. If we can't afford drinks, we'll bring a bottle in our purse. It's just about not letting anything bring you down.

Composition

"Tik Tok" is an upbeat dance-pop and electropop song that incorporates the sound of '80s video game noises in its production, to earn a bitpop beat.

Kesha uses a spoken word rap style in the verses while the chorus is sung. Throughout the song Kesha's vocals are heavily enhanced by Auto-Tune. The song also features two lines by P. Diddy ("Hey, what up girl?", which is said after he is mentioned in the lyrics, and "Let's go!") Lyrically, the song speaks about "excess pleasures, from drinking ("Ain't got a care in the world but I got plenty of beer") to men ("We kick 'em to the curb unless they look like Mick Jagger")." According to Kesha the lyrics are representative of herself, stating, "It's about my life. It's 100 percent me."

Kesha uses a rap vocal delivery which was influenced by the Beastie Boys. She claims that the track's creation would not have happened if it was not for their influence on her music. While the song was being crafted she took a different vocal approach to the song than in her earlier records, explaining, "I've done the country, done the pop-rock, done the super-hard electro, ... I was like, whatever, throw some rap in there, why not?" The song is in common time with a moderate beat rate of 120 beats per minute. The song is set in the key of D minor. It has the sequence of B–C–Dm as its chord progression and Kesha's vocals span from D3 to D5, similar to that of "California Gurls" by Katy Perry. Musically, the song has been compared to Lady Gaga's debut single, "Just Dance", for their similar composition and lyrical context and to Fergie for their similar rap style.

Release and promotion
In July 2009, the song was offered as a free download on Kesha's Myspace page for over a month before its official sale release. The song was later released to iTunes on August 7, 2009 and on August 25, 2009 in the United States. Barry Weiss of RCA/Jive Label Group relied on a similar marketing scheme to that of Britney Spears' in 1999 when choosing to give the song away for free.  The song's marketing relied heavily on radio once she had achieved a strong online interest, but its radio release was delayed until October in order to capitalize on social media interest in her. The song quickly topped iTunes charts after. The song appeared in the film Diary of a Wimpy Kid: Rodrick Rules. It was also featured in the notorious "couch gag" for the television show The Simpsons.To promote the single, Kesha made several television appearances and performances across the world. The first televised performance of the song was on a part of MTV Push, a program broadcast on MTV Networks worldwide, where she performed the song alongside her other tracks "Blah Blah Blah" and "Dinosaur". She performed the song alongside "Blah Blah Blah", "Take It Off", "Your Love Is My Drug" and "Dirty Picture" in a set for BBC Radio 1's Big Weekend. On May 29, 2010, Kesha performed "Tik Tok" alongside "Your Love Is My Drug" at the MTV Video Music Awards Japan.

Kesha has also made appearances on It's On with Alexa Chung, The Wendy Williams Show, Lopez Tonight, Late Night with Jimmy Fallon, The Tonight Show with Conan O'Brien and The Ellen DeGeneres Show to perform the song. This song was also performed on Saturday Night Live on April 17, 2010. On August 13, 2010, Kesha performed "Tik Tok" on Today. On November 7, 2010, Kesha performed the song at the MTV Europe Music Awards. Throughout the performance, she was seen wearing a leotard with day-glow makeup. The performance featured a backing consisting of flashing lights and background dancers. The song's bridge was changed during the performance and featured a more "amping house music vibe".

Critical reception

Kelsey Paine of Billboard called the song "a love letter to DJs everywhere, with hand claps that build to a crescendo of pure, infectious dance-pop." Paine, referring to her appearance on "Right Round", wrote that she "offers her own fun and frivolous ode to a wild night out" as she sings about drinking and men. The review was concluded with the consensus the Kesha's debut "reveals a knack for getting the party started." Jim Farber of the New York Daily News called the song "a vintage lick of dance candy too tooth-rottingly sweet to resist" that featured a "stabbing synthesizer hook". Fraser McAlpine of the BBC, giving the single four out of a possible five stars, called it a "dirty little ditty" that had "'hit' written all over it". McAlpine noted its similarities to Lady Gaga's "Just Dance" for their partying subject matter, but concedes that "she does make it sound kinda fun though." Billy Johnson Jr. of Yahoo! compared "Tik Tok" to the 1980s L'Trimm hit "Cars That Go Boom" and notes that Kesha has "take[n] on L'Trimm's vocal styling for her own hit."

Nick Levine of Digital Spy gave the song four out of five stars, he spoke of the song giving Kesha a "hussy image" but described the lyrics in a positive manner. Levine said the use of auto-tune was "fun" and described Dr. Luke's backing track as "bouncy" and "bubblegummy". The review highlighted the song's chorus with Levine calling it "stonking great" and "completely trashy in the best possible way." David Jeffries of Allmusic called the track "fun", listing it as one of the album's best tracks. David Renshaw of Drowned in Sound felt that the song was effective in what it was trying to do, writing: "Trashy and rambunctious, it’s a brash summer anthem about getting drunk and partying hard. World rocking it might not be, but as a piece of disposable pop it captures a moment and boasts a huge hook which, really, is all you need to rule the radio, TV and ringtone airwaves." Mikael Wood of Entertainment Weekly listed the song as the recommended download off of Animal, writing that "her Valley Girl sneer with electro-glam arrangements that make brushing one's teeth 'with a bottle of Jack' sound like an awesome way to kill the morning-after blues."

Jonah Weiner of Slate Magazine gave the song a negative review saying that "the song sets up ship on the fault line between charmingly daft and deeply irritating." He then compared the song to work by other artists, stating that "the rapped verses are sub-Fergie-grade, proudly stuffed with groaners and to-hell-with-the-expiration-date slang." Weiner echoed the sentiment that the plotline seemed like "a sequel" to "Just Dance", summing it up as "girl wakes up drunk, stays drunk, finds a dance floor and (spoiler alert) gets even drunker." Jon Caramanica of The New York Times described the song as "a zippy and salacious celebration of late nights and mornings-after." He noted that "some have compared Kesha, unfavorably, to Uffie, who is signed to the influential French electronic music label Ed Banger and whose sass-rap predated Kesha’s by a couple of years." However, he thought that "if anyone should feel fleeced by 'Tik Tok', though, it’s Lady Gaga, who probably hears significant chunks of her hit 'Just Dance' in its melody and subject matter."

Chart performance
In the United States, "Tik Tok" debuted at number 79 on the Billboard Hot 100 on the week ending October 24, 2009. It was the first Hot 100 number one of the 2010s decade and stayed at the top for nine consecutive weeks. On the ending December 31, 2009, "Tik Tok" broke the record for the highest U.S. single-week sales, selling 610,000 digital downloads. The record was surpassed by Taylor Swift's "We Are Never Ever Getting Back Together" (2012) when it sold 623,000 digital copies in its debut week. On the week ending February 6, 2010, "Tik Tok" topped Pop Songs with 11,224 spins on airplay, breaking the record by Lady Gaga's "Bad Romance" for the most single-week plays on pop radio. On Billboard's year-end charts of 2010, it topped the Hot 100 and placed at number seven on Radio Songs and number eight on Digital Songs. "Tik Tok" was certified eight times platinum by the Recording Industry Association of America for eight million units based on sales and streaming, and by March 2016, had sold 6.8 million downloads.

The single also peaked atop the Canadian Hot 100 and was certified seven times platinum by Music Canada. "Tik Tok" peaked atop the singles charts of European and Oceanic countries including Australia, France, Germany, New Zealand Norway, and Switzerland. It was certified nine times platinum by the Australian Recording Industry Association and double platinum by Recorded Music NZ. In the United Kingdom, "Tik Tok" peaked at number four on the UK Singles Chart and by 2012, ranked at number 100 on the Official Charts Company's list of the 150 best-selling singles of the 21st century. In South Korea, "Tik Tok" was the best-selling digital single by a foreign artist of 2010, selling 1.4 million downloads.
According to the International Federation of the Phonographic Industry, the single sold 12.8 million digital copies worldwide in 2010, making it the best-selling single of the year. As of August 2019, it had sold over 18 million copies worldwide.

Music video
The music video for "Tik Tok" was directed by Syndrome. It was shot in Kesha's old neighborhood and the car featured in the video belongs to her. Kesha explained the experience saying, "the video I'm excited about because I actually got to shoot it in my old neighborhood and the guy driving my gold car is a friend of mine". The video's party scene was shot in her friend's house, which they refer to as the "drunk tank". The singer said "the last party scene is in this house called the drunk tank, which is one of my friend's houses that we all go party at. So I like it cause its super-honest and genuine."

The video begins with Kesha waking in a bathtub in a home as she stumbles out and begins to look for a toothbrush in the restroom. She makes her way down a staircase looking at the pictures lining the wall. Kesha makes her way to the kitchen and walks in on a family who are having breakfast, startling them. She shrugs and then leaves the home as the family gets up and follows her. When she arrives at the sidewalk, she picks up a gold bicycle lying against a fallen fence and rides off. Kesha meets a group of children and trades the bicycle for their boombox. The video cuts to another scene where she rejects a guy and is picked up by a man portrayed by Simon Rex who drives her in a gold 1978 Trans Am. They are pulled over by the police, who handcuff Kesha. The scene then pans to her singing while standing in the T-top as she dangles the handcuffs hanging from her left arm. The next scene shows Kesha in an empty room filled with glitter. She then attends a party with Rex for the final scene. The video comes to an end with Kesha lying in a different bathtub from the one she woke up in, while Spanish voices in Mexican accents are heard in a market-like way, implying she ended up crossing the border. The official music video has received over 550 million views on YouTube as of February 2021.

Cover versions and parodies

The second-most-viewed YouTube video of the year 2010, behind only "The Bed Intruder Song", was a parody of "Tik Tok" posted by The Key of Awesome. "Weird Al" Yankovic included the chorus in his polka medley "Polka Face" from his 2011 album Alpocalypse. The song was also parodied by British comedy group The Midnight Beast. The parody discusses youthful subjects such as attempting to view the nude bodies of women and dodging parents' anger. Released to iTunes on January 15, 2010, the parody peaked at number four on the Australian Singles Chart, and at thirty-nine on the Irish Singles Chart. Comedian Julie Brown parodied the song with the single "Another Drunk Chick" on her album Smell the Glamour (2011). Jarett Wiselman  of The New York Post stated it was "one of the year's best comedy albums." Avril Lavigne performed an acoustic version of the song in her setlist for BBC's Radio 1.

Another parody came about when Israel Defense Forces soldiers created IDF Tik Tok in 2010, a viral dance video that opens with six infantry soldiers on patrol in Hebron, walking cautiously down a deserted street, armed and wearing full combat gear, when "Tik Tok" begins to play, and the soldiers break into choreographed dance moves. "Tik Tok" was used in the opening sequence for The Simpsons episode "To Surveil with Love", in which the entire cast lip-synced to the song.

The cast of FOX musical series Glee performed this song on the episode "Blame It on the Alcohol", with Heather Morris' character, Brittany Pierce, taking the lead. The episode revolved around teen drinking and its dangers. The members of Glee Club are asked to perform at the school's alcohol awareness assembly, in which "Tik Tok" is one of the songs performed. Emily VanDerWerff of The A.V. Club wrote that the song's inclusion in the episode was superfluous, stating that it was just an excuse to get a Kesha song on Glee. VanDerWerff however, wrote that she "REALLY liked Heather Morris'" rendition of the song. Sandra Gonzalez of Entertainment Weekly praised Brittany's choreography and overall performance in "Tik Tok", writing, "The huge star of this number was clearly Brittany, who more and more every week proves that she needs to be moved to the forefront of this show's big performances and storylines." Gonzalez gave the cover version of "Tik Tok" a B, calling it "pure, fun entertainment up until we got to the part straight out of the mind of Gordie LaChance." Erica Futterman of Rolling Stone gave the cover version of "Tik Tok" a mostly positive review, writing, "Love Brittany as we do, we wish Rachel or Mercedes stepped up to the mic. The performance is less risqué than their Pep Rally "Push It" but winds up causing more controversy when Brittany pukes on Rachel and Santana also vomits up grey slush. It's a fitting end to the song, and the episode."

During the fifth season of the Masked Singer, Caitlyn Jenner sang the song disguised as “The Phoenix”. Jenner's rendition went viral and Kesha eventually reacted to it on the coincidentally similarly named app TikTok.

Accolades

Track listing

US single
"Tik Tok"  – 3:20

Germany/UK single
"Tik Tok"  – 3:20
"Tik Tok" (Tom Neville's Crunk & Med Mix)  – 6:53

UK EP
"Tik Tok"  – 3:20
"Tik Tok" (Fred Falke Club Remix)  – 6:42
"Tik Tok" (Chuck Buckett's Verucca Salt Remix Remix)  – 4:55
"Tik Tok" (Tom Neville's Crunk & Med Mix)  – 6:53
"Tik Tok" (Untold Remix)  – 5:01

Credits and personnel
Recording
Recorded at Conway Recording Studios, Los Angeles, California

Personnel

Background vocals – Kesha, P. Diddy
Lead vocals – Kesha
Songwriting – Kesha Sebert, Lukasz Gottwald, Benjamin Levin
Production – Lukasz Gottwald, Benjamin Levin
Instruments and programming – Lukasz Gottwald, Benjamin Levin

Recording – Lukasz Gottwald, Benjamin Levin
Audio engineering – Emily Wright, Sam Holland
Vocal editing – Emily Wright

Credits adapted from the liner notes of Animal, Dynamite Cop Music/Where Da Kasz at BMI.

Charts

Weekly charts

Monthly charts

Year-end charts

Decade-end charts

All-time charts

Certifications and sales 

! scope="row" | South Korea (Gaon)
|  || 2,512,000
|-

Release history

References

External links
"Tik Tok" music video at MTV.com

2009 debut singles
2009 songs
Billboard Hot 100 number-one singles
Canadian Hot 100 number-one singles
European Hot 100 Singles number-one singles
Kesha songs
Number-one singles in Australia
Number-one singles in Israel
Number-one singles in New Zealand
Number-one singles in Norway
Number-one singles in Russia
RCA Records singles
SNEP Top Singles number-one singles
Song recordings produced by Benny Blanco
Song recordings produced by Dr. Luke
Songs about alcohol
Songs written by Benny Blanco
Songs written by Dr. Luke
Songs written by Kesha